Bassmaster Classic XXXI was held August 2–4, 2001 in the Louisiana Delta surrounding New Orleans. Kevin VanDam of Kalamazoo, Michigan, won his first of four classics with a three-day total weight of 32 pounds, 5 ounces. He won $100,000 in prize money. The 2001 Classic was the first covered by ESPN. It broadcast daily updates of the competition as well as part of the final weigh-in from the Louisiana Superdome.

Top 5 finishers1. Kevin VanDam, Kalamazoo, Michigan, 32-052. Scott Rook, Little Rock, Arkansas, 31-043. David Walker, Cannon, Kentucky, 31-034. Harold Allen, Shelbyville, Texas, 27-105. Gerald Swindle, Hayden, Alabama, 26-11

See also
Bassmaster Classic

References

External links
 Official site

Fishing tournaments
Sports in Louisiana
Fishing tournaments
Caesars Superdome